Albergaria  or Albergheria or Palazzo Reale is a historical quarter of the Italian city of Palermo in Sicily. 

The District is southwest of Castellammare or Loggia.

History of Palermo
Tourist attractions in Palermo
Zones of Palermo